In jazz and blues, a blue note is a note that—for expressive purposes—is sung or played at a slightly different pitch from standard. Typically the alteration is between a quartertone and a semitone, but this varies depending on the musical context.

Origins and meaning

The blue notes are usually said to be the lowered third, lowered fifth, and lowered seventh scale degrees. The lowered fifth is also known as the raised fourth. Though the blues scale has "an inherent minor tonality, it is commonly 'forced' over major-key chord changes, resulting in a distinctively dissonant conflict of tonalities". A similar conflict occurs between the notes of the minor scale and the minor blues scale, as heard in songs such as "Why Don't You Do Right?", "Happy" and "Sweet About Me".

In the case of the lowered third over the root (or the lowered seventh over the dominant), the resulting chord is a neutral mixed third chord.

Blue notes are used in many blues songs, in jazz, and in conventional popular songs with a "blue" feeling, such as  Harold Arlen's "Stormy Weather". Blue notes are also prevalent in English folk music. Bent or "blue notes", called in Ireland "long notes", play a vital part in Irish music.

Theory and measurement 
Music theorists have long speculated that blue notes are intervals of just intonation not derived from European 12-tone equal temperament tuning. Just intonation musical intervals derive directly from the harmonic series. Humans naturally learn the harmonic series as infants. This is essential for many auditory activities such as understanding speech (see formant) and perceiving tonal music. In the harmonic series, overtones of a fundamental tonic tone occur as integer multiples of the tonic frequency. It is therefore convenient to express musical intervals in this system as integer ratios (e.g.  = octave,  = perfect fifth, etc.). The relationship between just and equal temperament tuning is conveniently expressed using the 12-tone equal temperament cents system. Just intonation is common in music of other cultures such as the 17-tone Arabic scale and the 22-tone Indian classical music scale. In African cultures, just intonation scales are the norm rather than the exception. As the blues appears to have derived from a cappella field hollers of African slaves, it would be expected that its notes would be of just intonation origin closely related to the musical scales of western Africa.

This bending or glide between the two tones is an essential characteristic of the blues.

The blue "lowered fifth" has been found to be quite separate from the perfect fifth and clusters with the perfect fourth with which it is commonly slurred.

Kubik and Curry proposed  as it is commonly heard in the barbershop quartet harmonic seventh chord. The barbershop quartet idiom also appears to have arisen from African American origins. It was a surprising finding that  was a much more common tonal location although both were used in the blues sometimes within the same song.

It should not be surprising that blue notes are not represented accurately in the 12-tone equal temperament system, which is made up of a cycle of very slightly flattened perfect fifths (i.e. ). The just intonation blue note intervals identified above all involve prime numbers not equally divisible by 2 or 3. Prime-number harmonics greater than 3 are all perceptually different from 12-tone equal temperament notes.

The blues has likely evolved as a fusion of an African just intonation scale with European 12-tone musical instruments and harmony. The result has been a uniquely American music which is still widely practiced in its original form and is at the foundation of another genre, American jazz.

See also 
Altered chord
Harmonic seventh
Major and minor
Twelve-bar blues

References

Further reading
Schuller, Gunther. Early Jazz: Its Roots and Musical Development (New York: Oxford University Press, 1968), pp. 46–52). Cited in Benward & Saker (2003), p. 39.

Musical notes
Jazz techniques
Blues
Jazz terminology